Home is the debut album from Ryan Malcolm, who was the winner of the first season of Canadian Idol. The album was released on December 9, 2003.

Reception

Commercial performance
The album debuted and peaked at #4 on the Canadian Albums Chart. The album was later certified platinum, selling over 170,000 copies.

Critical reception
The album received a "bad" rating from NOW's Sarah Liss, who wrote "The tunes on Home are as watered-down, radio-friendly and lyrically vapid as you'd expect, but they're all over the musical map, jumping from whiny soul-lite to wannabe Loverboy 80s rawk to Simple Plan-worthy punk-pop."

In a lukewarm review, David Hayden of The Coast wrote "It doesn’t feel like Malcolm really cares about these tunes, as he never really sinks his teeth in like he did during the competition."

Awards
Despite receiving mostly negative reviews, the album earned a Juno nomination for Best Pop Album in 2004.

Singles
"Something More", the debut single from the album, was released on radio the day after Malcolm's win and to the public on September 30, 2003. The single went four times platinum on the first day of its release and stayed at #1 on the Canadian Singles Chart for 14 consecutive weeks.
The second single, ""Star of All the Planets," peaked at #79 on the Canadian Singles Chart.
The third single, "You Made This Fool Become a Man," failed to chart.

Track listing
 "Star Of All Planets"
 "Straight Up The Middle"
 "Crash & Burn"
 "You Made This Fool Become A Man"
 "Absolutely Perfect"
 "I Gotta Be Me"
 "Memory Lane"
 "Home"
 "Ride"
 "October Skies"
 "Don't Dream It's Over" (with Gary Beals)
 "Something More"
 "Nothing Left To Say"
 "Good Girls"
 "Your Heart Will Know"

References

2003 debut albums